Bernhard Adalbert Emil Koehne (12 February 1848 – 12 October 1918) was a German botanist and dendrologist born near Striegau, a town known today as Strzegom, Poland.

Koehne was a professor of botany in Berlin and was a leading authority of the plant family Lythraceae. In Adolf Engler's treatise Das Pflanzenreich ("The Plant Kingdom"), he was author of the chapter on Lythraceae. He also made important contributions involving Lythraceae to Engler and Karl Prantl's Die Natürlichen Pflanzenfamilien ("The Natural Plant Families"), as well as to Karl Friedrich Philipp von Martius' Flora Brasiliensis.

Another noted written effort by Koehne was the 1893 Deutsche Dendrologie ("German Dendrology"). 

Two plant genera have been named in his honor; Koehneola from Cuba, in the (family Asteraceae) was named in 1901, and Koehneria from Madagascar, in  the family Lythraceae in 1987.

References 
 This article is based on a translation of an equivalent article at the German Wikipedia, Source listed as: Robert Zander, Fritz Encke, Günther Buchheim, Siegmund Seybold (eds.): Handbook of Plant Names . 13th Edition. Ulmer Verlag, Stuttgart 1984, .

External links 
 IPNI List of plants described and co-described by Koehne.

20th-century German botanists
People from the Province of Silesia
1848 births
1918 deaths
19th-century German botanists
People from Strzegom